Konstantinos "Kostas" Totsios (born August 7, 1978) is a Greek professional basketball player who last played for Iraklis of the Greek A2 Basket League. Totsios has spent all of his career, except for two seasons, in the Greek  A2, becoming the league's all-time leading scorer, while he was also the first player to reach the 400 games milestone in the league.

Professional career
In the summer of 2005, Totsios signed for Kozani-based team Makedonikos of the Greek Basket League. Totsios became the all-time topscorer in the Greek A2 on 13 January 2013 as he scored 24 points against Pagrati, reaching a total of 4,937. A few weeks later, he surpassed the 5,000 points mark, as he scored 19 points against OFI. Totsios finished second in the voting for MVP of the 2014–15 Greek A2 behind Giannis Gagaloudis, and was eventually named in the league's first-team.

In the summer of 2015 Totsios signed with Ethnikos Piraeus. In June 2016, Totsios became the first player to appear in 400 games in the Greek A2 as he played for Ethnikos Piraeus against Promitheas Patras, while during the season he also surpassed 6,000 points. His effort during the season, earned him a spot in the second team of the Greek A2 League. In July 2016, Totsios agreed to terms with Iraklis Thessaloniki of the Greek A2.

Career statistics

Greek Basket League

|-
| align="left" | 2002–03
| align="left" | Olympia Larissa
| 25 || —  || 18.0 || .477 || .219 || .667 || 1.7 || 1.2 || .3 || .0 || 6.2
|-
| align="left" | 2005–06
| align="left" | Makedonikos
| 23 || — || 12.2 || .540 || .400 || .714 || 1.1 || .3 || .0 || .0 || 3.9
|-
|- class="sortbottom"
| style="text-align:center;" colspan="2"| Career
| align="right" | 48 || — || 15.2 || .497 || .277 || .683 || 1.4 || .8 || .2 || .0 || 5.1
|-

References

External links
Basketball-reference.com profile
FIBA profile

1978 births
Living people
Ethnikos Piraeus B.C. players
Greek Basket League players
Greek men's basketball players
Gymnastikos S. Larissas B.C. players
Ionikos Lamias B.C. players
Iraklis Thessaloniki B.C. players
Makedonikos B.C. players
Olympia Larissa B.C. players
Shooting guards
Basketball players from Serres